Connor Bell  (born 21 June 2001) is  New Zealand field athlete. He represented his country at the 2022 Commonwealth Games, and is a two-time national champion in the discus throw.

On 25 January 2020, at the Potts Classic, Hawkes Bay Sports Park, in Hastings, Bell threw 63.25 m, a throw that would place him 31st for the year worldwide in 2020. At the same venue, on 23 January 2021, Bell set a new personal best throw of 64.29 m. On 27 March 2021, Bell won the New Zealand national championship with a throw of 61.85. In 2022, Bell repeated his national title win and added a victory in the Oceania Championship discus competition.

Bell competed in the men's discus throw at the 2022 Commonwealth Games. He was the sixth-placed qualifier for the final, where he finished eighth with a best throw of 60.23 metres.

At the Pre-Potts track and field meeting in Hastings on 18 January 2023, Bell broke the New Zealand national discus throw record, with a distance of 66.14 metres, breaking the previous mark of 65.03 metres set by Ian Winchester in 2002.

At the Maurie Plant Meet - Melbourne on 22 February 2023, Bell bettered his own national record with 66.23 metres.

References

External links
 
 
 

2001 births
Living people
New Zealand male discus throwers
Youth Olympic gold medalists for New Zealand
Athletes (track and field) at the 2018 Summer Youth Olympics
Commonwealth Games competitors for New Zealand
Athletes (track and field) at the 2022 Commonwealth Games
21st-century New Zealand people